Hymenobacter koreensis  is an extremely halophilic and aerobic bacterium from the genus of Hymenobacter which has been isolated from a salt mine in Wensu County in China.

References

External links
Type strain of Hymenobacter koreensis at BacDive -  the Bacterial Diversity Metadatabase

koreensis
Bacteria described in 2013
Halophiles